An Earthly Paradise For The Eyes is an English title for the Czech comedy film Zemský ráj to na pohled, directed by  and released in 2009. It portrays the adventures of a dissident family and their friends while under observation by pro-Soviet secret police in Prague between 1968 and 1977, during the country's period of "normalization"—forced revocation of the legislation and customs of the reform period led by Alexander Dubček (1963/1967 – 1968).

Cast
Vilma Cibulková as Marta
Miroslav Etzler as Mirek
Igor Bareš
Jiří Dvořák as Petr Hána
Jan Hartl as Director Kovác
Tereza Voříšková as Gábina
Jan Zadražil as Tomás
Ondřej Vetchý as Jan Pavel
Dana Marková as Majda
Barbora Seidlová as Lenka

Awards
(From Czech Wikipedia article)
 Tereza Boučková's screenplay received in 2006 the first-prize Sazka Award for best unproduced screenplay.
 Tereza Voříšková was nominated for the Czech Lion Award 2009 in the category "best actress in a supporting role".
 The film won the critics award FIPRESCI at the Moscow Film Festival.
 Vilma Cibulková won the Moscow International Film Festival Award for best actress, for her role in this film.

References

External links
 

2009 films
Czech comedy films
2009 comedy films
2000s Czech films